Mike Dopud (Мајк Допуђ) is a Canadian actor, stuntman, and former football player known for his supporting roles on television. His best-known roles include Vic Hadfield in the miniseries Canada Russia '72, Jason Micic on Power, Kimbo Comstock on Arctic Air, Roy McAfee on Cedar Cove, Viktor Mikalek on Arrow, and Michael Vinson on The 100. He also took on several minor roles on Stargate SG-1 and Stargate Atlantis, as well as performing many stunts on both shows, before taking on a bigger role as Varro on Stargate Universe. He was nominated for a Taurus World Stunt Award in 2005 for his work in Walking Tall.

Background
Dopud was born and raised in Montreal, Quebec. He speaks three languages fluently (English, French and Serbian). He played professional Canadian football briefly for the Saskatchewan Roughriders.

Filmography

Film

Television

Video games

References

External links

Living people
20th-century Canadian male actors
21st-century Canadian male actors
Male actors from Montreal
Canadian male film actors
Canadian male stage actors
Canadian stunt performers
Canadian male television actors
Canadian male voice actors
Canadian people of Serbian descent
Players of Canadian football from Quebec
Saskatchewan Roughriders players
Year of birth missing (living people)